Cyperus longi-involucratus is a species of sedge that is native to parts of Tanzania.

See also 
 List of Cyperus species

References 

longi-involucratus
Plants described in 1983
Flora of Tanzania
Taxa named by Kåre Arnstein Lye